Soorma Bhopali is a 1988 Indian Hindi-language film produced by Naved and directed by Jagdeep, who previously played Soorma Bhopali in the movie Sholay.

This film is one of the earliest works for the music director duo Dilip Sen – Sameer Sen. One of the last released songs of Mohammed Rafi "Makhmal Ho Ya Taat Ka Parda" is in this film, picturised on Danny Denzongpa.

Plot
Soorma Bhopali is the owner of a Timber mart. He wants to distribute all his wealth to humanity. His trust and innocence are taken advantage of by the people. Dilwar Khan Dilwala, who happens to be the identical step brother of Soorma, keeps staking his claim on half of Soorma's inheritance. Soorma inherited a priceless necklace which, according to his mother, he will have to give to his bride. To get the necklace from Soorma, a group of smugglers sends a stage dancer, Sitara, to Bhopal to trap Soorma. Soorma takes the necklace and follows Sitara to Bombay, but two thieves by the name of Kaalia and Sambha relieve Soorma of his belongings, including the necklace.

Cast

 Jagdeep as Soorma Bhopali / Dilawar Khan Dilwala
 Dharmendra as Mahendra Singh / Himself (Double Role In Special Appearance)
 Amitabh Bachchan as Police Inspector (Special Appearance)
 Rekha as Drunk Woman (Special Appearance)
 Danny Denzongpa as Qawwali Singer (Special Appearance)
 Aruna Irani
 Ranjeet
 Kader Khan

Soundtrack
Music: Dilip Sen - Sameer Sen, Lyrics: Asad Bhopali.

References

External links
 

Indian parody films
1980s Hindi-language films
1988 films
Films scored by Dilip Sen-Sameer Sen
Sholay